Poppy Cannon (August 2, 1905 – April 1, 1975) was a South African-born American author, who at various times the food editor of the Ladies Home Journal and House Beautiful, and the author of several 1950s cookbooks. She was an early proponent of convenience food: her books included The Can Opener Cookbook (1951) and The Bride's Cookbook (1954). Other books included The President's Cookbook: Practical Recipes from George Washington to the Present (1968).

Career
Her writing style was distinctive and has been described as "relentless." Her recipes might call for such measurements as "a splotch of wine," "a flurry of coconut," or "a great swish of sour cream," and she once advised readers that they could "rassle a lemon pie in a jiff" with "the new wonderstuff called Clovernook."

She was a contemporary of James Beard and Julia Child, and she collaborated with Alice B. Toklas on Aromas and Flavors of the Past and Present.

Personal life
She was born Lillian Gruskin in Cape Town as part of a large Lithuanian Jewish community in South Africa.  Her parents had been called Robert and Henrietta Gruskin, but had apparently changed their names to Robert and Marion Whitney at the time of their immigration to Pittsburgh, Pennsylvania, in 1908.  Her sister Anne Fogarty became a popular fashion designer during the 1950s. Laura Shapiro's 2015 book Something From the Oven: Reinventing Dinner in 1950s America suggests that the two kept in touch over the years but were not close.

Poppy Cannon married four times and had three children. Her third husband was restaurateur Claude Philippe of the Waldorf Astoria New York, with whom she had a daughter, Claudia. In 1949 she became the second wife of the NAACP leader Walter Francis White (with whom she had an affair while he was married to his first wife, Leah Gladys Powell White) at a time when such a marriage was viewed as scandalous, not least within the Black community, some of whom viewed White's marriage to a white woman as a betrayal. The couple lived in New York until White's death in 1955. She wrote a biography of White, Gentle Knight, published the following year.  (According to the family history of her second husband, he was descended from the ninth president.)

Cannon died on April 1, 1975 after falling from the 23rd floor balcony of her apartment in New York City. She was 69 years old, and had been in failing health in recent years.

References

Further reading 
 Laura Shapiro. Something From the Oven: Reinventing Dinner in 1950s America, Viking, 2004.

External links
 Walter Francis White and Poppy Cannon Papers. Yale Collection of American Literature, Beinecke Rare Book and Manuscript Library.
 The Women's Review of Books: A feminist guide to good reading
 Brown Sugar: Soul Food Desserts from Family and Friends by Joyce White from HarperCollins Publishers
 The Daguerreian Society: DagNews
 Lime Jell-O Marshmallow Cottage Cheese Surprise contains birth date

1905 births
1975 deaths
American food writers
Jewish American writers
American people of Lithuanian-Jewish descent
American people of South African-Jewish descent
South African Jews
South African emigrants to the United States
South African people of Lithuanian-Jewish descent
Deaths from falls
20th-century American non-fiction writers
20th-century American women writers
American women non-fiction writers
20th-century American Jews